Gordon Lightfoot (born November 17, 1938) is a Canadian singer-songwriter who achieved international success in folk, folk-rock, and country music. He is credited with helping to define the folk-pop sound of the 1960s and 1970s. He is often referred to as Canada's greatest songwriter and is known internationally as a folk-rock legend.

Lightfoot's discography comprises 19 studio albums, three live albums, 16 greatest hits albums and 46 singles. Lightfoot's songs, including "For Lovin' Me", "Early Morning Rain", "Steel Rail Blues", "Ribbon of Darkness"—a number one hit on the U.S. country chart with Marty Robbins's cover in 1965—and "Black Day in July" about the 1967 Detroit riot, brought him wide recognition in the 1960s. Canadian chart success with his own recordings began in 1962 with the No. 3 hit  Me) I'm the One", followed by recognition and charting abroad in the 1970s. His topped the US Hot 100 and/or AC chart with the hits "If You Could Read My Mind" (1970), "Sundown" (1974); "Carefree Highway" (1974), "Rainy Day People" (1975), and "The Wreck of the Edmund Fitzgerald" (1976), and had many other hits that appeared within the top 40. Several of his albums achieved gold and multi-platinum status internationally.

Studio albums

1960s

1970s

1980s

1990s–2020s

Live albums

Compilation albums

Tribute albums

*  Tony Rice Sings Gordon Lightfoot is a compilation of Lightfoot songs recorded by Tony Rice on a number of albums.

** Ladies Sing Lightfoot features 14 newly recorded performances by Darling West, the Kennedys, Natalie Noone, Shawn Barton Vach, Arwen Lewis, the Textones, Susan Coswill, Ilsey Juber, Katy Moffatt, Sarah Kramer, Kristi Callan, Shayna Adler and Carla Olson.

Singles

1960s

1970s

1980s

1990s–2010s

Charted B-sides

Music videos

Video albums and documentaries
 Tears Are Not Enough (w/ Northern Lights) (1985)
 Live in Reno (2000)
 Greatest Hits Live (2003)
 Gordon Lightfoot: If You Could Read My Mind (2019)
 Lightheaded (in production)

Notes

A ^ Sit Down Young Stranger was re-released as If You Could Read My Mind in 1971.
B ^ Credited to Gord Lightfoot. Canada did not have a national singles chart at the time of release—these chart figures are from Toronto's CHUM Chart.  All other Canadian chart figures from RPM magazine.

References

External links
 

Country music discographies
Discographies of Canadian artists
Folk music discographies